Uttar means north in Hindi and many other Indian languages. It can be found in:
Uttar, Tank, a union council in Pakistan
Uttar Dinajpur
Uttarkashi
Uttarkashi District
Uttar Pradesh
Uttarakhand
Uttara Kannada

Peoples 
Uttar Kumar

See also
 Uttara (disambiguation)